Sajóbábony Vegyész Sportegyesület is a professional football club based in Sajóbábony, Borsod-Abaúj-Zemplén County, Hungary, that competes in the Nemzeti Bajnokság III, the third tier of Hungarian football.

Name changes
 2015–present: Sajóbábonyi Vegyész SE

Season results
As of 21 August 2018

External links
 Sajóbábony at Mlsz.hu
 Profile on Magyar Futball

References

Football clubs in Hungary
Association football clubs established in 1952
1952 establishments in Hungary